"Head Banger", also "Headbanger", is the second single released from EPMD's fourth album, Business Never Personal.

The song, which was produced by member Erick Sermon, featured verses from K-Solo and Redman, both members of EPMD's rap collective, the Hit Squad. The single became a minor hit on both the R&B and rap charts. peaking at 75 on the Hot R&B/Hip-Hop Singles & Tracks and 11 on the Hot Rap Singles. The song used three samples, Parliament's "One Of Those Funky Thangs", Joe Tex's "Papa Was Too" and Brand Nubian's "Slow Down", and was later sampled itself by the Ruff Ryders on "Ryde or Die", which served as the opening song on their debut album, Ryde or Die Vol. 1. This was EPMD's final release before disbanding, eventually returning five years later in 1997.

Single track listing

A-Side
"Head Banger" (LP Version)- 4:51
"Head Banger" (Radio Version)- 4:31

B-Side
"Head Banger" (Remix Radio Edit)- 4:57
"Scratch Bring It Back"- 3:04

Charts

References

1992 singles
EPMD songs
Song recordings produced by Erick Sermon
Songs written by Erick Sermon
Def Jam Recordings singles
Redman (rapper) songs
1992 songs
Songs written by PMD (rapper)